John Peter Gilmore (25 August 1931 – 3 February 2013), known as Peter Gilmore, was an English actor, known for his portrayal of Captain James Onedin in 91 episodes of the BBC television period drama The Onedin Line (1971–1980), created by Cyril Abraham.

Early life
Born in Leipzig, Germany, and brought up in Nunthorpe, North Riding of Yorkshire, Gilmore left school at the age of 14 and started pursuing his dream of becoming an actor. In 1952, he attended the Royal Academy of Dramatic Art preparatory school Parada for a short time before being expelled.

Career
Gilmore had roles in 11 Carry On films, and appeared in many British films including The Great St Trinian's Train Robbery (1966), Oh! What a Lovely War (1969), The Abominable Dr. Phibes (1971) and Warlords of Atlantis (1978). During his early career, he appeared in several stage musicals, including Lock Up Your Daughters and released a single, "Follow That Girl" (HMV POP 740), in 1960. He played Macheath opposite Jan Waters as Polly in a 1968 production of the Beggar's Opera in London, in which both were praised for their portrayals. After achieving notice in the role of James Onedin, Gilmore felt he had become typecast as the rugged sea captain.

He later appeared in a Doctor Who serial Frontios (1984) in which he played a character called Brazen. Gilmore also appeared in a Heartbeat episode, called "The Frighteners", during the Nick Berry era; his third wife, actress Anne Stallybrass was a regular in the series.

Personal life
He married three times: to actress Una Stubbs (1958–1969), with whom he adopted a child; to Jan Waters (1970–1976); and to actress, and former Onedin Line colleague, Anne Stallybrass (1987–2013), who survived him.

Death
Peter Gilmore died in London on 3 February 2013, aged 81. He was survived by his third wife (Stallybrass), and a son, Jason, adopted during his first marriage.

Selected filmography

Master Spy (1963) - Tom Masters
Carry On Cabby (1963) - Dancy
Bomb in the High Street (1963) - Shorty
Carry On Jack (1963) - Patch, Pirate Captain, aka Roger 
Every Day's a Holiday (1964) - Kenneth
Carry On Cleo (1964) - Galley Master
I've Gotta Horse (1965) - Jock
You Must Be Joking! (1965)
Carry On Cowboy (1965) - Henchman Curly
Doctor in Clover (1966) - Len the choreographer
The Great St Trinian's Train Robbery (1966) - Butters
Don't Lose Your Head (1966) - Citizen Robespierre
The Jokers (1967) - Man at Party
Follow That Camel (1967) - Captain Humphrey Bagshaw
Carry On Doctor (1968) - Henry
Carry On Up the Khyber (1968) - Private Ginger Hale
Oh! What a Lovely War (1969) - Private Burgess
Carry On Again Doctor (1969) - Henry
My Lover My Son (1970) - Barman
Carry On Henry (1971) - King Francis of France
The Abominable Dr. Phibes (1971) - Dr. Kitaj
Freelance (1971) - Boss
Warlords of Atlantis (1978) - Charles Aitken
The Lonely Passion of Judith Hearne (1987) - Kevin O'Nell
Carry On Columbus (1992) - Governor of the Canaries

References

External links
 
 site dedicated to Gilmore and Stallybrass

1931 births
2013 deaths
20th-century English male actors
English male film actors
English male television actors
People from Nunthorpe